Max Porter may refer to:
 Max Porter (footballer)
 Max Porter (animator)
 Max Porter (writer)